Kuei or Guǐ may refer to:

People
 Kuei Chih-Hung (1937–1999), Chinese filmmaker 
 Kuei Chin (1090–1155), chancellor of the Song Dynasty
 Kuei Pin Yeo, Indonesian classical pianist and educator
 Kuei Ya Lei (born 1944), Chinese actress and singer

Other
 Catholic University of Eichstätt-Ingolstadt (Katholische Universität), a university in Eichstätt and Ingolstadt, Bavaria, Germany
 Kuei (comics), a character in the Young Allies by DC Comics 
 Kuei-chou or Guizhou, a southwestern province of the People's Republic of China
 Kuei River or Amu Darya, a major river in Central Asia 
 Kuih, a sweet Chinese dessert or snack made of rice
 Guǐ, a ghost in Chinese culture